The stippled spoon-nose eel (Echiophis punctifer, also known as the spoon-nose eel or the snapper eel) is an eel in the family Ophichthidae (worm/snake eels). It was described by Johann Jakob Kaup in 1859. It is a marine, tropical eel which is known from the western and eastern Atlantic Ocean, including the Gulf of Mexico, Cuba, northern South America, Senegal, and Angola.

The species epithet "punctifer", treated as a name in apposition, means "dotted" in Latin, and refers to the eel's colouration.

The eel is pinkish in color and has small dots, similar to leopard print. This eel is commonly found in shallow waters of Acapulco and the surrounding area, although it can also be found elsewhere.

References

Ophichthidae
Fish described in 1859